Gonzalo Claudio Bozzoni Ruiz (born 12 February 1990) is a Spanish-born Argentine professional footballer who plays as a defender.

Club career
Bozzoni's life as a senior footballer began in Spain with Atlético Madrid B (from 2007 to 2008) and Atlético Madrid C (from 2008 to 2009); having signed from Vélez Sarsfield where he spent six years in their academy. In 2011, after stints with Racing Club and River Plate, Bozzoni began featuring for Argentine Primera División side San Lorenzo. He made his professional debut on 14 October versus Banfield, before appearing again later that month against Arsenal de Sarandí. Those were his only two matches for San Lorenzo, with the defender departing ahead of 2013–14 to join Atlanta in Primera B Metropolitana. Nine appearances arrived.

Bozzoni moved to Aldosivi in July 2014; where he won promotion to the 2015 Primera División. Fénix signed Bozzoni on 21 February 2015. Having featured thirty-three times for Fénix in the third tier, Bozzoni joined Acassuso in June 2016. He netted the first goal of his career on 17 December as Acassuso defeated his ex-club Atlanta away from home. He made forty appearances across his opening two campaigns with them. Bozzoni departed in June 2019.

International career
Bozzoni represented Argentina at U15, at the South American Championship in 2005, and U17 level.

Career statistics
.

References

External links

1990 births
Living people
Footballers from Las Palmas
Spanish footballers
Argentine footballers
Argentina youth international footballers
Association football defenders
Spanish expatriate footballers
Expatriate footballers in Argentina
Spanish expatriate sportspeople in Argentina
Argentine Primera División players
Primera B Metropolitana players
Primera Nacional players
Atlético Madrid C players
Atlético Madrid B players
Racing Club de Avellaneda footballers
Club Atlético River Plate footballers
San Lorenzo de Almagro footballers
Club Atlético Atlanta footballers
Aldosivi footballers
Club Atlético Fénix players
Club Atlético Acassuso footballers